Dorothy Morang (1906–1994) was an American painter, pastelist, and active member of the Santa Fe art colony.

Dorothy Alden Clark was born in Bridgton, Maine on November 24, 1906. Her early formal study was in music at the New England Conservatory of Music in Boston and she taught piano throughout most of her life. She married artist/critic Alfred Morang June 13, 1930 and they moved to New Mexico in 1937 upon a doctor's recommendation that Alfred needed a higher, drier climate.

Primarily self-taught, Morang painted abstract easel paintings with the WPA Art Project from 1939–41 and later taught piano and music appreciation for the Music Project. She was associated with the Transcendental Painting Group, but was not an official member. Her artwork has been exhibited in New Mexico and nationally. Notably, her work was included in an exhibition at the Guggenheim Museum in New York in 1940, and presented in solo exhibitions at Paneras Gallery, New York, New York, in 1963 and 1965. She also worked in a variety of positions at the New Mexico Museum of Art from 1942 through 1963, including Curator of Fine Arts. Her work can be found in the collections of the New Mexico Museum of Art, University of New Mexico Fine Art Museum and West Texas Teacher's College Museum. In 1949 she helped found the Santa Fe Women Artists Exhibiting Group.

In 1950 Dorothy divorced Alfred Morang, and was remarried 15 years later to John C. Emmett. She died at the age of 88 on December 19, 1994.

References 

An Art Directory of New Mexico, compiled and edited by Reginald Fisher, Museum of New Mexico and School of American Research, 1947

Artists from New Mexico
American women painters
People from Bridgton, Maine
1994 deaths
1906 births
American art curators
American women curators
Artists of the American West
Painters from Maine
New England Conservatory alumni
20th-century American painters
20th-century American women artists
Pastel artists
People of the New Deal arts projects
20th-century American women pianists
20th-century American pianists